Kalgejje is a 2011 Indian Kannada-language musical romance film starring newcomers Vishwas and Roopika alongside Anant Nag. The film has been directed and written by A Bangaru and produced by debutant Nagabhushan under his home banner. Gandharva has composed the music.

Plot 
The film is about romance and has music as its primary element.

Cast 
 Vishwas as Gowri Shankar 
 Anant Nag
 Roopika as Aarti
 Rangayana Raghu
 Sumithra
 Pavitra Lokesh
 T. S. Nagabharana .... Guest Appearance
 V. Manohar .... Guest Appearance
 S. Mahendar ..... Guest Appearance

Soundtrack

Reception

Critical response 

 Shruti Indira Laskhminarayana of Rediff.com scored the film at 1.5 out of 5 stars and says "Kalgejje comes with a message for both parents and children. It, on one hand shows how wrong it is to impose one's career plans on their children, and on the other hand, shows how children should resist from disregarding parents. It also highlights the struggles of youth aiming to make it big in films. If the story was told in a different way, it would have come as a breath of fresh air". B S Srivani from Deccan Herald wrote "Instead, this patchwork quilt offers only visual treat, but no real comfort. Roopika is turning into a reliable performer while Vishwas would do well to acquire some seriousness in his outlook. Rangayana Raghu treads the thin line between ludicrity and credibility. Comedy turns into a farce. The sounds of this anklet do not resonate".

Awards 
Karnataka State Film Awards 2010-11
 Best Lyricist – A. Bangaru
 Best Sound Recording – Palani D Senapathi

References 

2011 films
2010s Kannada-language films